Arabu is an indigenous Brazilian dish from Acre consisting of raw eggs (usually turtle eggs) beaten with sugar and manioc flour.

References

Brazilian cuisine
Egg dishes